Grant Peak, is a 2,094-metre (6,870-feet) mountain in the Murray Range of the Hart Ranges in Northern British Columbia. 

Grant Peak is named after for Royal Canadian Naval Volunteer Reserve Ordinary Seaman George William Grant from Prince George, BC; serving with HMMTB 460 when he died, 2 July 1944.  O/S Grant is buried at Haslar Royal Naval Cemetery, Hampshire, UK.

References 

Two-thousanders of British Columbia
Northern Interior of British Columbia
Canadian Rockies
Peace River Land District